Lachninae is a subfamily of the family Aphididae, containing some of the largest aphids, and they are sometimes referred to as "giant aphids". Members of this subfamily typically have greatly reduced cornicles compared to other aphids, and the group has sometimes been classified as a separate family.

Genera

Cinara Curtis, 1835 
Essigella Del Guercio, 1909
Eulachnus Del Guercio, 1909 
Pseudessigella Hille Ris Lambers, 1966
Schizolachnus Mordvilko, 1909
Lachnus Burmeister, 1835 
Longistigma Wilson, 1909
Maculolachnus 
Neonippolachnus 
Nippolachnus Matsumura, 1917
Pterochloroides Mordvilko, 1914
Pyrolachnus Basu & Hille Ris Lambers, 1968
Sinolachnus Hille Ris Lambers, 1956
Stomaphis Walker, 1870
Tuberolachnus Mordvilko, 1909
Eotrama Hille Ris Lambers, 1969
Protrama Baker, 1920
Trama von Heyden, 1837

References

 
Hemiptera subfamilies